Alex Szabó (born 15 May 2002) is a Hungarian professional footballer who plays for Budapest Honvéd.

Club career
In July 2021, Szabó joined Szolnok on loan for the season.

Career statistics
.

References

External links

2002 births
People from Gyöngyös
Sportspeople from Heves County
Living people
Hungarian footballers
Hungary youth international footballers
Hungary under-21 international footballers
Association football defenders
Budapest Honvéd FC players
Budapest Honvéd FC II players
Szolnoki MÁV FC footballers
Nemzeti Bajnokság I players
Nemzeti Bajnokság II players
Nemzeti Bajnokság III players